Risqué may refer to:

 Material that is slightly indecent or liable to shock, especially as sexually suggestive
 Risqué (album), album by Chic
 Risque (comics), Marvel Comics character who debuted in X-Force
 Risqué (group), a 1980s Dutch dance music group

See also
 Risky (disambiguation)